Norman Howard Cliff (1925–2007) was a British Protestant author who wrote about Christianity and the history of Protestant missions in China.

Biography
Cliff was born in 1925 in Yantai (formerly, Chefoo) to Howard and Mary Cliff, both pharmacists who were working as missionaries with the China Inland Mission (CIM). As part of the Chefoo School, a boarding school of the CIM, Cliff was interned by the Japanese at the Weixian Internment Camp from 1943 until 1945, when the camp was freed by American paratroopers.

Cliff later went on to pursue a B.A. from the University of South Africa and a B.Com. from Rhodes University. He worked as a minister and an accountant for the United Reformed Church in South Africa, before returning to Britain due to poor health. Back in the UK, Cliff earned an MPhil at the Open University in 1983, writing a thesis on the theology of Watchman Nee, and a PhD at Buckingham University in  1995, writing a thesis on the history of Protestant missions in Shandong Province.

Works authored
 Prisoners of the Samurai: Japanese Civilian Camps, 1941-1945
 Fierce the Conflict (2001) 
 White Cliffs of Hangzhou
 Life and Theology of Watchman Nee : Including a Study of the Little Flock
 A Heart for China: The Gripping Story of Benjamin Broomhall
 A Flame of Sacred Love
 Courtyard of the Happy Way

References

English Protestant missionaries
Protestant missionaries in China
Christian writers
1925 births
2007 deaths
World War II civilian prisoners held by Japan
Alumni of the Open University
Internees at the Weixian Internment Camp
British World War II prisoners of war
British expatriates in China
20th-century British historians